Justin Kennedy (born 17 May 1972) is an actor, writer, voice-over artist and comedian from Melbourne, Australia. He started his performing career in 2002, after making his first stand-up appearance in the national Raw Comedy competition.

Career
In 2003, Kennedy teamed up with fellow comedians Gavin Baskerville and Dwight Bandy to write and perform the show Successful Losing: How to be a Spectacular Failure in both the WA Fringe Festival (winning 'Best Comedy') and the Melbourne International Comedy Festival. In 2004, Kennedy performed his first solo stand-up show in the Melbourne International Comedy Festival, Simple Pleasures, which he followed over the next four years with I'm With Stupid, Beelzebuzz (nominated for a Golden Gibbo Award), Ladies...? and Passionista.

In 2009, Kennedy teamed up with Sarah Collins to write and perform, Donna and Damo: An Asexual Love Story for the Melbourne Fringe before performing it at the Arts Centre in the 2010 Melbourne Comedy Festival. He proposed to Collins onstage during the curtain call of a performance in April 2010.

In 2008, Kennedy wrote and performed as a cast member of Foxtel's The Mansion with Michael Chamberlin and Charlie Pickering. He appeared three times on Foxtel's Stand Up Australia. He was a regular writer for Rove from 2007 until its final episode, appearing in numerous sketches during this time.

Kennedy has appeared as an actor in numerous television shows including The Time of Our Lives, The Secret, It's a Date and Utopia, as well as voiced characters for the animated series' Sumo Mouse, Flea-Bitten and SheZow.

Kennedy was formerly Head Writer at The Project and now writes for Hard Quiz and The Weekly with Charlie Pickering.

Select filmography
 Rove
 The Mansion
 Stand Up Australia
 The Secret
 Neighbours
 Stingers
 Reverse Runner

References

External links

 Official website

1972 births
Living people
Australian stand-up comedians